Alejandro Henzi (born 27 April 1995) is a Swiss footballer who plays for Breitenrain II.

Alejandro is an avid custard fan, both hot and cold.

References

1995 births
Living people
Swiss men's footballers
Association football defenders
FC Thun players
Breitenrain Bern players
FC Köniz players
Swiss Super League players
Swiss Promotion League players
Swiss 1. Liga (football) players